Qaf (the letter  qāf), is the 50th chapter (sūrah) of the Qur'an with 45 verses (āyāt). The name is taken from the single discrete Quranic "mysterious letter" qāf that opens the chapter. It is the beginning of the Hizb al-Mufassal, the seventh and the last portion (manzil). Concepts which "Qaf" deals with  the Resurrection and the Day of Judgement.

Summary
1 Q. The letter qāf 
2-3 The unbelievers wonder at the doctrine of the resurrection
4-5 Talks about the resurrection raising up to Allah and effect of disbelief in Truth
6-11 God’s works a proof of his power to raise the dead
12-14 The Quraish warned by the fate of other nations who rejected their prophets
15 God not so exhausted by the creation that he cannot raise the dead 
16 God is nearer to man than his jugular vein  
17-18 Angels  record all human thoughts and actions
19-20 Death and judgment shall overtake all men
21-22 The testimony of the two angels shall condemn the unbelievers
24-26 God shall cast the wicked into hell
27-29 The devils shall disclaim the idolaters in hell and the hell shall be filled with the wicked
30 God says to Hell-fire whether Hellfire has been filled fully. 
31-35 Paradise shall receive the true believers
36-37 Former generations destroyed as a warning to the people of Makkah
38 The heavens and the earth created in six days
39-40 Muhammad exhorted to patience with unbelievers
41-44 Events at Day of Resurrection and proof of Allah's ability to create and cause anything (especially, humans) to die
45  Muhammad not sent to compel men to believe, but only to warn them

See also
Esoteric interpretation of the Quran

References

External links

Qaf